Michon is a surname. It  may refer to:
 Alex Michon, a British artist
 Alexandre Michon (1858–1921), a Russian photographer and film director
 Cathryn Michon, actress, writer and stand-up comic
 Emmanuel Michon (born 1955), a French former ice speed skater
 Ingrid Michon (born 1976), a Dutch politician
 Jean-Louis Michon (born 1924), a French traditionalist scholar and translator who specializes in Islamic art and Sufism
 Louis-Marie Michon (1802-1866), a French surgeon
 Mélina Robert-Michon (born 1979), a French discus thrower
 Pierre Michon (born 1945), a French writer
 Stéphane Michon (born 1969), a French Nordic combined skier who competed in the 1990s